Lifelines is an Irish television chat show presented by broadcaster Liam Ó Murchú. Filmed in front of a studio audience, each programme is devoted to a special celebrity guest. The programme ran for four series from 1993 until 1996.

History

Lifelines was initially devised as an appropriate summer replacement for RTÉ's flagship Friday night chat show The Late Late Show. The show was presented by Liam Ó Murchú, the former host of Trom agus Éadrom, a bi-lingual chat show that was broadcast in the 1970s and 1980s. The first series began on 18 June 1993 and featured seven episodes. Lifelines  proved popular and returned for a second series of seven episodes on 17 April 1994. By now the show was given its own timeslot on Sunday evenings straight after the Nine O'Clock News. It complemented RTÉ's two other chat shows, The Late Late Show and Kenny Live, which were broadcast on Friday and Saturday nights respectively. A third series of Lifelines returned on 16 April 1995 and lasted for an extended run of ten episodes. The fourth and final series began on 7 January 1996 and ran for twelve episodes.

Production
The first three series of Lifelines were broadcast from Studio 1 in the RTÉ Television Centre at Donnybrook, Dublin 4.  As RTÉ's biggest at the time, the studio held 120 audience members.  The final series of the show was broadcast from Studio 4, a new studio specifically adapted to cater for large productions.  The size of the audience also increased to 200.

Format
Lifelines featured a special guest in profile every week. The show featured interviews with the special guest and their friends, as well as live music from guest music groups. The show was described as This Is Your Life without the surprise.

Episodes

Series 1

Series 2

Series 3

Series 4

References

1993 Irish television series debuts
1999 Irish television series endings
Irish television talk shows
RTÉ original programming
1990s Irish television series